Dermacentor circumguttatus is a species of hard tick belonging to the family Ixodidae.

Description
Ornamentation of males consists of eight pale spots near the periphery of the scutum. Festoons and central areas are inornate. In the females, the colour pattern is limited to three patches, one posteriorly and one anterolaterally on each side.

This African species has been found only on elephants and on the grey duiker (Sylvicapra grimmia). The main hosts of these hard ticks are the African bush elephant (Loxodonta africana) and the African forest elephant (Loxodonta cyclotis).

References

Ticks
Arachnids of Africa
Ixodidae
Animals described in 1897